Ernie Morley  ( – ) was a Welsh international footballer defender. He was part of the Wales national football team between 1925 and 1929, playing 4 matches. He played his first match on 28  February 1925 against England and his last match on 2 February 1929 against Ireland. At club level, he played for Swansea Town between 1924 and 1925.

See also
 List of Wales international footballers (alphabetical)

References

1901 births
Welsh footballers
Wales international footballers
Swansea City A.F.C. players
Place of birth missing
Year of death missing
Association football defenders